Vincenzo Tusa (12 July 1920 – 5 March 2009) was an Italian archeologist.

Biography 
After studying in Mistretta, Tusa graduated in Literature in Catania in 1944 and became an assistant in Archeology. In 1947. He was hired by the Superintendency of Antiquities in Bologna and two years later he was transferred to Palermo. In 1963 he assumed the post of Superintendent for the BBCC of western Sicily.

Tusa promoted excavations in the archaeological sites of Soluntum, Segesta, Selinunte, Motya, Marsala.

In the 60's Tusa was the promoter of the Sicilia Archeologica magazine.
From 1964 to 1991 he was also professor of Punic Antiquities at the Faculty of Letters of the University of Palermo.

He was a member of the Accademia dei Lincei in the Moral Sciences class for the Archeology category. His son Sebastiano Tusa, also an archaeologist, was head of the Superintendency for the Sea of the Sicilian Region.

His name appears on the list of members of the Masonic lodge P2.

Acknowledgments 
In Tusa the Sicilian Region has dedicated the Cave Archeology Area of Cusa Vincenzo Tusa.

Works 

 L'urbanistica di Solunto, 1970
 Anastylosis ad Agrigento Tempio di Eracle e Selinunte Tempio C, 1975
 La scultura in pietra di Selinunte, 1984
 La preistoria in Sicilia, 1987
 Selinunte nella mia vita, 1990
 Segesta, 1991
 Siciliani illustri: Antonino Salinas, 1995
 Sarcofagi romani in Sicilia, 1995
 Il parco archeologico di Selinunte, 2011

References

External links 

 
 

Members of the Lincean Academy
Italian archaeologists
20th-century archaeologists
21st-century archaeologists
1920 births
2009 deaths